Aidena Mustafaj (born 18 February 1998) is an Albanian footballer who plays as a midfielder and has appeared for the Albania women's national team.

Career
Mustafaj has been capped for the Albania national team, appearing for the team during the 2019 FIFA Women's World Cup qualifying cycle.

See also
List of Albania women's international footballers

References

External links
 
 
 

1998 births
Living people
Footballers from Shkodër
Albanian footballers
Albanian women's footballers
Women's association football midfielders
Albania women's international footballers